The name Carlos has been used for eight tropical cyclones in the Eastern Pacific Ocean.
 Tropical Storm Carlos (1979), did not make landfall
 Tropical Storm Carlos (1985), did not affect land
 Hurricane Carlos (1991), no damage reports
 Tropical Storm Carlos (1997), never threatened land; no casualties or damage were reported
 Tropical Storm Carlos (2003), damaged about 30,000 houses in Mexico, with a monetary damage total of 86.7 million pesos (2003 MXN, $8 million 2003 USD)
 Hurricane Carlos (2009), did not affect land
 Hurricane Carlos (2015), a small tropical cyclone which brushed the western coast of Mexico
 Tropical Storm Carlos (2021), did not affect land

The name Carlos has been used once in the Australian region.
 Cyclone Carlos (2011), record three-day total of 684.8 mm (26.96 in) rain was recorded at Darwin International Airport

The name Carlos has been used once in the South-West Indian Ocean.
 Cyclone Carlos (2017)

Pacific hurricane set index articles
Australian region cyclone set index articles
South-West Indian Ocean cyclone set index articles